Racine Lutheran High School is a private religious high school located in Racine, Wisconsin. It is associated with the Lutheran Church–Missouri Synod. Founded in 1944, the school has an enrollment of about 225 students.

Academics 

Christian education in the Lutheran tradition is tied into daily school life for all students at RLHS.

Extracurricular activities

Athletics 
Sports offered at Racine Lutheran include football, soccer, volleyball, basketball, golf, trap-shooting, wrestling, baseball, softball, and track and field.

Drama 
Racine Lutheran has a drama program that produces about one show per semester. Past productions include Bye Bye Birdie,  The Diary of Anne Frank,  Aladdin and His Magical Lamp, Inside Lester, and 12 Angry Jurors (an adaptation of 12 Angry Men).

Music 
Racine Lutheran High School offers a range of music programs, including band, choir, and handbells, jazz band, and a brass ensemble.

Notable people
Van H. Wanggaard politician and police officer 
Alex Scales American professional basketball player

References

External links 
 Racine Lutheran High School website

Educational institutions established in 1944
High schools in Racine, Wisconsin
Private high schools in Wisconsin
Lutheran schools in Wisconsin
1944 establishments in Wisconsin
Secondary schools affiliated with the Lutheran Church–Missouri Synod